Sotra or Store Sotra is the name of a large island in Øygarden Municipality in Vestland county, Norway, located just west of the city of Bergen. It is part of a pair of islands called 'Sotra' and 'Litlesotra' ('small Sotra') that are part of a large archipelago stretching from Fedje southwards along the coast of Norway.  The larger island of the two is Store Sotra (also called Sotra), and the smaller (and least populated) of the two is Litlesotra.  Roughly 28,700 (2017) people live on the two islands of Sotra, with the larger island having a population of about 19,100 (2017) and 9,589 (2017) living on the smaller island.

Geography
The main population centres on Sotra include (from north to south) Vindenes, Ågotnes, Knappskog, Møvik, Tælavåg, Hammarsland, Skogsvåg, and Klokkarvik.

The island of Sotra is part of an archipelago, so it is surrounded by islands and waterways.  To the east of Sotra lies the island of Litlesotra.  The small islands of Bildøy and Geitung lie near Litlesotra.  The Raunefjorden (to the east) separates Sotra from the mainland Bergen Peninsula.  The small islands of Tyssøyna, Lerøyna, and Bjelkarøyna lie in the Raunefjorden off the southeastern coast of Sotra.  To the south of Sotra lies the island of Toftøya and the Korsfjorden.  To the west of Sotra lie a number of small islands including Algrøyna and Lokøyna.  Finally, to the north of Sotra lie the small islands of Misje, Turøyna, and Toftøyna.  Sotra is connected to the mainland by a series of road bridges across Bildøy and Litlesotra before crossing the Sotra Bridge, the seventh-longest suspension bridge in Norway.

Media gallery

References

Islands of Vestland
Archipelagoes of Norway
Øygarden
Landforms of Vestland